Phoenix is the second studio album by British singer Rita Ora, released on 23 November 2018 through Atlantic Records UK. The release was Ora's first album since Ora in 2012. Ora announced the album on 18 September 2018 and it was made available for pre-order the same day. The album spawned three top ten UK singles including "Your Song", "Anywhere" and "Let You Love Me", as well as a top forty single, "Girls". Phoenix also includes two collaborations from other projects, including "Lonely Together" from Avicii's last release Avīci (01) (2017) and "For You (Fifty Shades Freed)" with Liam Payne, taken from the Fifty Shades Freed: Original Motion Picture Soundtrack (2018).

The album received generally favourable reviews from music critics. Phoenix charted in the top twenty in the UK, Ireland, Australia and New Zealand amongst other countries. Ora supported the album with two concert tours, The Girls Tour (2018) and the Phoenix World Tour (2019–2020).

Background
In December 2015, Ora started legal proceedings against Roc Nation, seeking release from the record label and citing that the contract she signed in 2008 was "unenforceable", due to California's "seven-year rule". The complaint stated that she had "only been permitted to release one album despite creating multiple additional records for release" and that her relationship with Roc Nation was "irrevocably damaged". In January 2016, Roc Nation filed a counter-lawsuit against Ora for breaking her recording contract. They reached a settlement in May 2016.

In June 2016, it was confirmed that Ora had signed a global record deal with Atlantic Records UK. Soon after, she began to work on her second studio album. In an interview with Billboard Radio China, Ora said of the process:

 

Elaborating on what fans could expect from the album, Ora said:

Music and lyrics

Phoenix is a uptempo dance-pop and pop record that was recorded between 2016 and 2018. It incorporates a mixture of genres including R&B-inspired vocals, EDM-lite beats as well as electronic anthems like "Lonely Together", Ora's joint collaboration with Avicii, "Anywhere" and the Rudimental collaboration, "Summer Love". The latter also contains elements of drum and bass music. Ora's vocals were described by The Guardians Tara Joshi as both "wispy" and "powerful", and by NME Hannah Mylrea as "distinctive". "Anywhere" was produced by Alesso and Sir Nolan, described by The Independent as a "hazy EDM banger" and by Mylrea (of NME) as a "chunk of electropop". Critics noted that it has several bridges and a gritty drop. Meanwhile, on the mid-tempo track "Let You Love Me", Ora explores emotional barriers with lyrics that include "I wish that I could let you love me/ Say what's the matter with me?".

"Your Song" has a minimalist production largely consisting of drum pads. The song "New Look" takes a different direction; it is a Scandi-pop and tropical song produced by Swedish outfit Jack & Coke. Its production sounds like "it's being played on a radio with intermittent signal". There are several collaborations on the album including "Keep Talking" which features Julia Michaels and was described by Joshi as both "intriguing" and "euphoric". Another collaboration, "Girls", features American rapper Cardi B, American singer Bebe Rexha and British singer Charli XCX. It was described as AllMusic's Neil Yeung as a "bold statement" and a "saucy, sex-positive anthem for the 21st century". Critics such as Joshi (The Guardian) noted that it was an ode to bisexuality.

Themes on the album include love and in particular "struggling or heat-of-the-moment relationships" as seen on the songs "Falling to Pieces", "First Time High" and "Only Want You", with the latter also being released as a single and spawning a remix featuring vocals by American singer 6lack. "Falling to Pieces" features a trumpet interlude after each chorus and closes out the track with a trumpet outro. Meanwhile, Padin Malvika from Clash noted that "First Time High" has a breezy sound that "leaves you feeling happier and lighter", whilst "Only Want You" was noted for its electro production.

Towards the end of the album, "Velvet Rope" and "Cashmere" are ballads that combine influences from jazz and R&B. "Velvet Rope" is a "smooth, slowed-down R&B jam about a scorned ex-lover left wondering how her relationship collapsed." The song features a stripped back piano melody with a chorus of backing singers. In a slight contrast, Billboards Sophie Ding said the song "features soaring, multilayered melodies over deep reverbs as Ora sings about exploring a new relationship".

The album also includes Ora's joint single with Liam Payne, "For You", which was released in promotion of Fifty Shades Freed (2018), the third and final film in the erotic romantic drama film series Fifty Shades.

Promotion and release
Ora said that the album would be released sometime after March 2018. Then during an interview with Glamour (Germany), she announced that it was now coming out in autumn 2018. On 18 September 2018, Ora revealed the title of her second studio album and its release date, 23 November. The same day, the album was made available for pre-order.

In the eight days leading up to the album's release a number of songs were released as promotional countdown singles including: "Velvet Rope" on 15 November 2018, "Cashmere" on 19 November 2018 and "Falling to Pieces" on 21 November 2018.

Singles
"Your Song" was released on 26 May 2017 as the album's lead single. The song peaked at number seven on the UK Singles Chart, becoming Ora's ninth single to reach the top ten in the UK. "Anywhere" was released on 20 October 2017 as the second single from the album. The song reached number two in the UK.

"Girls", featuring Cardi B, Bebe Rexha and Charli XCX, was released on 11 May 2018. Ora performed the song live for the first time at the 2017 BBC Radio 1's Big Weekend, one year before its official release. "Let You Love Me" was released as the album's fourth single on 21 September 2018. Reaching a peak of number four, it made Ora the first British female solo artist with thirteen top ten songs in the UK. The fifth and final single, "Only Want You" was released on 1 March 2019 with a feature from American rapper 6lack.

Other songs
"Lonely Together" was released on 11 August 2017 as a joint single from Avicii's EP, Avīci (01). The song reached number four on the UK Singles Chart. "For You" was released with Liam Payne on 5 January 2018 as the lead single from the Fifty Shades Freed soundtrack. The song peaked at number eight in the UK.

On 14 November 2018, Ora released the song "Velvet Rope" as first promotional single from the album. It's official lyric video was released the next day.

On 19 November 2018, "Cashmere" was released as the second promotional single from the album.

"Falling to Pieces" was released as the third and final promotional single on 21 November 2018.

Tour

On 29 October 2018, Ora announced that she would be embarking on the Phoenix World Tour in 2019 in support of Phoenix, consisting of twenty-four dates across Europe, Asia and Oceania from 1 March until 29 May 2019.

Critical reception

Phoenix received positive reviews from music critics. According to review aggregator, Metacritic, which assigns a normalised rating out of 100 to reviews from mainstream critics, the album received a weighted score of 76, based on seven reviews, indicating "generally favourable reviews".

Accolades
Phoenix was included on AllMusic's "favourite pop albums of 2018" year-end list.

Track listing
Adapted from album booklet and liner notes.

Notes
 also vocal producer
 denotes additional production by

Personnel and credits
Credits and personnel adapted from Phoenix album notes.

Performers

Rita Ora – lead vocals, background vocals
Piers Aggett – background vocals
Amir Amor – background vocals
Avicii – lead artist (track 4)
Cardi B – featured vocals (track 10)
Charli XCX – featured vocals (track 10)
Kesi Dryden – background vocals
Fred Gibson – background vocals
Max Grahn – background vocals
Jakob Jerlström – background vocals
Peter Karlsson – background vocals
Finn Keane – background vocals
Brian D. Lee – background vocals
Julia Michaels – featured vocals (track 11)
Ali Payami – background vocals
Liam Payne – lead vocals (track 8), background vocals
Mary Pearce – background vocals
Bebe Rexha – featured vocals (track 10)
Leon Rolle – background vocals
Rudimental – co-lead artist (track 9)
Ed Sheeran – background vocals
Ali Tamposi – background vocals
Andrew Watt – background vocals

Musicians and technicians

Piers Aggett – piano, synthesizer
Alesso – instrumentation, keyboards, producer, programming
Amir Amor – drum programming, guitar
Chris Athens – mastering
Avicii	– instrumentation, keyboards, programming
Louis Bell – engineer, instrumentation, keyboards, producer, programming
Conor Bellis – assistant engineer
Zara Beyounces – violin
Ben Billions – keyboards, producer
Tim Blacksmith – executive producer
Benny Blanco – instrumentation, keyboards, producer, programming
Cashmere Cat – instrumentation, keyboards, producer, programming
Jeff Citron – assistant engineer
Jonny Coffer – keyboards, piano, producer, programming
Jeremy Cooper – arranger, editing
Anna Croad – violin
Hales Curtis – design
Danny D. – executive producer
Rosie Danvers – cello, string arrangements
Fiona Davies – viola
Brendan Dekora	– vocal engineer
Kesi Dryden – bass, keyboards
Mikkel Storleer Eriksen – engineer, programming
Michael Freeman – assistant mixer
Serban Ghenea – mixing
Fred Gibson – drums, guitar, keyboards, producer, programming
Kevin Grainger – mastering
Josh Gudwin – guitar engineer
John Hanes – engineer
Stuart Hawkes – mastering
Tor Erik Hermansen – programming
Sam Holland – engineer
Jack & Coke – arranger, drums, instrumentation, keyboards, producer
Sally Jackson – violin
Jaycen Joshua – mixing
Peter Karlsson – vocal producer
Finn Keane – drums, keyboards, producer, programming
Patrick Kiernan – violin
Dave Kutch – mastering
Paul Lamalfa – vocal engineer
Nolan Lambroza – instrumentation, keyboards, programming
Chris Laws – drums, engineer
Jeremy Lertola	– assistant engineer
Steve Mac – keyboards, piano, producer
Eleanor Mathieson – violin
Randy Merrill – mastering
Steve Morris – violin
Jane Oliver – cello
Emma Owens – viola
Ali Payami – bass, drums, horns, keyboards, percussion, producer, programming
Geoff Pesche – mastering
Richard Pryce – double bass
Dann Pursey – engineer
Cory Rice – assistant engineer
Robbie Nelson – engineer
Lewis Roberts – additional production, keyboards, programming
David Rodriguez – engineer
Leon Rolle – keyboards, percussion
Rudimental – producer
Kotono Sato – violin
Chris Sclafani – engineer
Ed Sheeran – guitar
Sir Nolan – producer
Stargate – producer
Mark "Spike" Stent – mixing
Andrew Watt – bass, guitar, instrumentation, keyboards, producer, programming, vocal producer
Steven Weston – engineer
Deborah Widdup – violin
Jerome Williams – additional production, programming
Daniel Zaidenstadt – engineer, vocal engineer

Recording studios

Chuck's Place (Beverly Hills)
Deep Cuts (Los Angeles)
KBK (Stockholm)
TEN87 (London)
Kensaltown Studios (London)
RAK Studios (London)
Jack & Coke Studios (Stockholm)
Abbey Road (London)
Linxegatan 82 (Stockholm)
Matzah Ball (New York City)
Downtown Studios (New York City)
Henson Studios (Los Angeles)
Rockstone Studios (London)
Eastwood Studios (Los Angeles)
Metropolis Studios (London)
Westlake Studios (Los Angeles)
Gold Tooth Music (Beverly Hills)
Sarm Studios (London)
Intergalactic Studios (London)
MXM Studios (Los Angeles)
Sterling Sound (New York City)
Major Toms Studios (London)
Larrabee Sound Studios (North Hollywood)

Artwork
Hayley Louisa Brown – photography
Hales Curtis – design

Charts

Weekly charts

Year-end charts

Certifications

|-
! scope="row"| Taiwan (RIT)
| Gold
| 5,000
|-

Release history

Notes

References

2018 albums
Rita Ora albums
Atlantic Records albums
Albums produced by Andrew Watt (record producer)
Albums produced by Benny Blanco
Albums produced by Cashmere Cat
Albums produced by Fred Again
Albums produced by Louis Bell
Albums produced by Stargate
Albums produced by Steve Mac